Berlin Osdorfer Straße station is a Berlin S-Bahn station on the Anhalt Suburban Line in Lichterfelde in the Berlin borough of Steglitz-Zehlendorf, which is served by S-Bahn line S25 and S-Bahn line S26. It was put into operation in 1998 and is thus one of the newest Berlin S-Bahn stations.

Location

The station is located on the Anhalt line in Licherfelde in the borough of Steglitz-Zehlendorf, about 13 km south-west of the centre of Berlin. It borders on Osdorfer Straße and Hildburghauser Straße (streets). Berlin-Lichterfelde Süd station is about 1.1 km to the south and Lichterfelde Ost station is about 1.6 km to the northeast. Osdorfer Straße station is located in the Berlin fare zone B of the Verkehrsverbund Berlin-Brandenburg.

Naming

The station is named after the areas immediately adjacent to the station on Osdorfer Straße (road to Osdorf). Osdorf was formerly a municipality in the district of Teltow-Fläming south of Berlin.

History

A station at the location of the current Osdorfer Straße station was already planned in the 1970s to serve the Thermometersiedlung high-rise housing estate more effectively. After the widening of Osdorfer Straße, Deutsche Reichsbahn was commissioned to widen the railway bridges and build the new tracks for the proposed station. The cost was to be met by the Senate of Berlin. However, the new work was not completed until 1998. The Lichterfelde Ost–Lichterfelde Süd S-Bahn line was reopened with the opening of the station.

Infrastructure

The station has a flat island platform, which is not covered, and an exit at the northern end and two at the southern end. The station is thus accessible from both sides of Osdorfer Straße. A 31 m long corridor leads from a glazed southern staircase to the platforms.

Connections 

The station is served by line S25 and S-Bahn line S26 of the Berlin S-Bahn. It is also by some bus routes.

See also 

 List of railway stations in Berlin

References

Sources

External links 

 
  

Berlin S-Bahn stations
Buildings and structures in Steglitz-Zehlendorf
Railway stations in Germany opened in 1998